Kateretes pusillus is a species of beetle belonging to the family Kateretidae.

It is native to Europe.

References

Kateretidae
Beetles described in 1794